Hyloxalus maculosus (spotted rocket frog) is a species of frogs in the family Dendrobatidae. It is endemic to the eastern slopes of Ecuadorian Andes in Napo and Pastaza provinces at elevations of  asl.

Taxonomy
Hyloxalus maculosus has been considered a synonym of Hyloxalus bocagei, but it is now treated as a valid species, though within the Hyloxalus bocagei species complex. In addition to morphological differences in both tadpoles and adults, male call parameters differ between Hyloxalus maculosus and Hyloxalus bocagei.

Description
Males measure  and females  in snout–vent length. Dorsum is reddish-brown, more reddish posteriorly and in the hind limbs. There are brighter reddish-brown spots posterior to eyes and on arms at the arm-body junction. An oblique lateral stripe is present; it is complete but becoming diffused anteriorly or incomplete. Toe webbing is extensive.

The male call is a long trill composed of paired pulsed notes.

Habitat and conservation
The range of Hyloxalus maculosus is within "Lowland Evergreen Forest" and "Foothill Evergreen Forest" vegetation zones. Males have been found calling on rocky streams at both sides of a road and inside water ducts that cross under the road. One male carrying nine tadpoles was found near a tiny pond, on a rocky stream surrounded by pasture. Tadpoles have been found in slow-running water in the ditch.

The International Union for Conservation of Nature has assessed Hyloxalus maculosus as "Data Deficient" in 2008, but Páez-Vacas and her colleagues suggested in 2010 that it should be considered as "Critically Endangered" because of its small range and habitat loss occurring in that range.

References

maculosus
Amphibians of the Andes
Amphibians of Ecuador
Endemic fauna of Ecuador
Amphibians described in 1991